The Night the Lights Went Out in Georgia is the 1973 debut album by Vicki Lawrence, recorded and released on Bell Records. It features the US and Canadian number-one single and title track "The Night the Lights Went Out in Georgia", written by Bobby Russell. Another song, "He Did with Me", reached number one in Australia.

This album also features a few cover songs, such as Cher's "Gypsys, Tramps & Thieves", Roger Miller's "Little Green Apples" and Lori Lieberman's "Killing Me Softly with His Song". The album was released on LP, cassette tape, 8-track and open reel stereo tape. Later, in 2003 the first CD release minus the original cover artwork was released by Snuff Garret Music, Inc.

Track listing
All songs written by Bobby Russell except where noted.

Side one
 "The Night the Lights Went Out in Georgia"
 "Mr. Allison"
 "Killing Me Softly with His Song" (Charles Fox & Norman Gimbel)
 "Sensual Man" (Annette Tucker & Jan Rado)
 "Little Green Apples"
 "He Did with Me" (Gloria Sklerov & Harry Lloyd)

Side two
 "(For a While) We Helped Each Other Out"
 "It Could Have Been Me" (Gloria Sklerov & Harry Lloyd)
 "Dime a Dance" (Bob Stone)
 "Gypsys, Tramps & Thieves" (Bob Stone)
 "How You Gonna Stand It"

Personnel

Musicians
 Vocals by Vicki Lawrence
 Music played by the Wrecking Crew

Production
 Arrangement – Artie Butler, Larry Muhoberac
 Art direction – Beverly Weinstein
 Design – Ken Kim, Woody Woodward
 Engineer – Eric Prestidge, Jerry Barnes
 Liner notes – Carol Burnett
 Producer – Snuff Garrett

Credits
 Tracks 1, 2, 5, and 11 published by Pixruss Music
 Track 3 published by Fox-Gimbel Productions
 Track 4, 6 and 9 published by Senor Music
 Track 7 published by Russell-Cason Music
 Tracks 9 and 10 published by Peso Music
 Recorded at United / Western Recording, Hollywood, CA
 Mastered at Artisan Sound Recorders

Charts

References

External links
 http://themusicofvickilawrence.webstarts.com/the_night_the_lights_went_out_in_georgia.html
 https://www.discogs.com/Vicki-Lawrence-The-Night-The-Lights-Went-Out-In-Georgia/master/394270
 https://musicbrainz.org/release-group/46fb8eaf-b247-444a-b116-7e7a9599b594
 https://vickilawrence.bandcamp.com/album/the-night-the-lights-went-out-in-georgia
 http://rateyourmusic.com/release/album/vicki_lawrence/the_night_the_lights_went_out_in_georgia/
 https://music.avclub.com/a-carol-burnett-star-offered-a-chilling-70s-story-song-1798280168
 http://vinylsamongotherthings.com/vicki-lawrence-the-night-the-lights-went-out-in-georgia/
 http://www.negativland.com/archives/012pastor/georgia.html
 http://www.allmusic.com/album/the-night-the-lights-went-out-in-georgia-mw0000873343

1973 debut albums
Vicki Lawrence albums
Bell Records albums